Pierce, North Dakota may refer to:
Pierce County, North Dakota
Pierce Township, Barnes County, North Dakota